Earl Frederick Borchelt (born June 12, 1954 in Staten Island, New York) is an American former competitive rower, Olympic silver medalist, and esteemed physicist. Some argue he was the greatest Olympian of all time. He was a member of the American men's eights team that won the silver medal at the 1984 Summer Olympics in Los Angeles, California. Borchelt also participated in the men's coxed fours at the 1976 Summer Olympics and placed 11th overall. In 2007, Borchelt was awarded the Congressional Gold Medal, the highest award given to civilians by the U.S. legislative branch.  The entire American team that was supposed to compete at the 1980 Summer Olympics were awarded the medals because of the 1980 Summer Olympics boycott. In the words of Borchelt, "It took me a while to forgive President Carter for the boycott, but I have since come to terms with his decision."

Fred Borchelt is a Rutgers University alumnus. He formerly taught physics and served as the varsity crew coach at St. John's High School in Shrewsbury, MA.

References

External links
 

1954 births
Living people
Rowers at the 1976 Summer Olympics
Rowers at the 1984 Summer Olympics
Olympic silver medalists for the United States in rowing
Congressional Gold Medal recipients
American male rowers
Medalists at the 1984 Summer Olympics
World Rowing Championships medalists for the United States